Overgard or Øvergård is a surname. Notable people with the surname include:

Elling Øvergård (1947–1999), Norwegian sports shooter
Kjell Øvergård (born 1947), Norwegian politician 
William Overgard (1926–1990), American cartoonist and writer 

Norwegian-language surnames